The Medicine Man is a 1933 British comedy film directed by Redd Davis and starring Claud Allister, Frank Pettingell, Pat Paterson, and Ben Welden.

It was produced at Twickenham Studios as a quota quickie for distribution by the American company RKO Pictures. The film's sets were designed by the art director James A. Carter.

Plot summary
A young man impersonates a doctor.

Cast
 Claud Allister as Hon. Freddie Wiltshire
 Frank Pettingell as Amos Wells
 Pat Paterson as Gwendoline Wells
 Ben Welden as Joe Garbel
 Jeanne Stuart as Flossie
 Viola Compton as Mrs. Wells
 George Mozart as 	Sir Timothy Rugg
 Drusilla Wills as Boadicea Briggs
 Ronald Simpson as Dr. Wesley Primus
 Victor Stanley as Bitoff
 Syd Crossley as 	A Commissionaire
 Andreas Malandrinos as 	A Hotel Manager 
 Betty Astell as Patient
 John Turnbull as Police Inspector

References

Bibliography
 Chibnall, Steve. Quota Quickies: The Birth of the British 'B' Film. British Film Institute, 2007.

External links
The Medicine Man (1933) at IMDB

1933 films
Films directed by Redd Davis
1933 comedy films
British comedy films
Films shot at Twickenham Film Studios
Quota quickies
RKO Pictures films
British black-and-white films
1930s English-language films
1930s British films